Liquid Dreams may refer to:

 Liquid Dreams (film), 1991 American film
 "Liquid Dreams" (song), 2000 O-Town song